Frank Bernard Sinkovitz (May 20, 1923 – August 6, 1989) was an American football center and linebacker who played six seasons in the National Football League. He then worked as an umpire for 26 seasons, wearing uniform number 20, which was later worn by Larry Nemmers. He officiated Super Bowl XV. He was born in Steelton, Pennsylvania and died in Baltimore, Maryland.

References

External links
 

1923 births
1989 deaths
American football centers
American football linebackers
Duke Blue Devils football players
National Football League officials
Pittsburgh Steelers players
People from Dauphin County, Pennsylvania
Sportspeople from Harrisburg, Pennsylvania
Players of American football from Harrisburg, Pennsylvania